Thomas Bussey may refer to:

 Thomas H. Bussey (1857–1937), American politician from New York
 Thomas P. Bussey (1905–1981), American  judge from South Carolina